The Yabhon United 40, also called Yabhon Smart Eye 2, is an unmanned aerial vehicle (UAV) capable of remotely controlled or autonomous flight operations developed by Adcom Systems primarily for the United Arab Emrates Air Force (UAEAF). It functions as a MALE (medium-altitude long-endurance) and can be utilized for special missions, reconnaissance, humanitarian missions, intelligence, or military operations.

Specifications
The Yabhon United 40 can operate at a maximum altitude of 7,000m and can fly for up to 120 hours (5 days). The aircraft is fitted with synthetic aperture radar (SAR), terrain avoidance systems and a gimbaled camera. The Yabhon United 40 can carry 1,050 kg on its four under-wings and has a 6-unit rotating dispenser for propulsion Rotax 914UL mounted in the fuselage.

History
The Yabhon United 40 was unveiled in 2013 Dubai Air Show. It was named United 40 to mark 40 years of the United Arab Emirates formation.

Operators
 - Renamed as Algeria 54. At least 10 in development. Manufactured locally. 2 in service as of 2019.
 - Purchased an unknown number from the UAE 
 - 2 drones.

See also
Adcom Systems
 Orion

References

Medium-altitude long-endurance unmanned aerial vehicles
Unmanned aerial vehicles of the United Arab Emirates
Emirati inventions